The Theban Tomb of Neferkhawet MMA729 is located in El-Assasif, Theban Necropolis. The tomb contained the burials of Neferkhawet, his wife Rennefer, his son Amunemhet, his daughter Ruiu, and his son or son-in-law Bakamun called Baki. Neferkhawet was a scribe and keeper of the documents during the Thutmosid period.

Neferkhawet and Rennefer

Neferkhawet and his wife were buried in the Western chambers of the tomb. Neferkhawet served as a chief scribe to Hatshepsut when she was still a princess. He later became the treasurer and keeper of the documents in the House of the God's Wife Hatshepsut. his wife Rennefer was a Lady of the House. The bodies had been mummified in a simple fashion. The internal organs had not been removed, but the bodies were treated with natron. The burial equipment did include canopic jars, which were empty.

Amenemhet, Ruiu and Baki

The son Amenemhet, daughter Ruiu and son or son-in-law Baki were buried in the Eastern chamber of the tomb. As with the older generation, these bodies were mummified by simply immersing them in natron. The internal organs were left in the bodies and the canopic jars in the tomb were empty.

Additional burials
Next to Amenemhet, Ruiu and Baki the excavators found five more burials. The additional bodies appear to be of either poor relations or servants of the family. The bodies do not show signs of deliberate mummification. Hayes refers to the individuals by Roman numerals:
 Burial VI - infant girl 12–15 months old, buried in anthropoid coffin
 Burial VII - six-year-old boy, buried in a rectangular wooden coffin
 Burial VIII - adult woman, buried in a rectangular wooden coffin. The coffin originally belonged to a scribe named Neferkhawet.
 Burial IX - an infant aged less than 6 months buried in anthropoid coffin
 Burial X - boy 9–10 years old, buried in a rectangular wooden coffin

See also 

 List of MMA Tombs

References 

Theban tombs